Anna Sophina Hall (August 7, 1857 – December 17, 1924) was a leading figure in the movement to legalize euthanasia in the United States during the first decade of the 20th century.

Early life
Anna Sophina Hall was born to Charles Francis Hall, a noted Arctic explorer.

Activism
Her letter-writing campaign attracted such prominent women as The New York Times columnist Lurana Shelton and co-founder of Volunteers of America and former Salvation Army officer Maud Ballington Booth to the euthanasia cause. As a result of her efforts, the Ohio state legislature came within 54 votes of legalizing the practice in 1906.

Death
Hall died on December 17, 1924 in Cincinnati. She was cremated at the Cincinnati Crematory.

References

Sources 
 
 
 

1857 births
1924 deaths
American suffragists
Assisted suicide in the United States
Euthanasia activists
People from Cincinnati